Springwood is an electoral district of the Legislative Assembly in the Australian state of Queensland.

The district is based in several suburbs of Logan City. It is named after the suburb of Springwood and also includes the suburbs of Daisy Hill, Loganholme, Rochedale South and Shailer Park. The electorate was first contested in 1986.

History and political profile
The inaugural member for Springwood was Huan Fraser, who represented the National Party. Labor's Molly Robson defeated Fraser in the 1989 state election. She held the seat in the 1992 election, but lost it to the Liberal's Luke Woolmer in 1995 on the back of the Koala tollway controversy, in which the sitting Labor government had announced plans to build a tollway through a koala sanctuary. Woolmer won the seat with a 19.4% swing, but narrowly lost it to Labor in 1998. Labor continued to hold the seat in the 2001, 2004, 2006 and 2010 elections. In 2012, John Grant, a Logan City Councillor, won the seat for the Liberal National Party with a 19.47% swing.

Members for Springwood

Election results

References

External links
 

Springwood